= 2002 St. Charles County Executive election =

- November 5, 2002

Nominee	Joe Ortwerth	Joe Koester
Party	Republican	Democratic
Popular vote	55,880	45,491
Percentage	55.12%	44.88%
County Executive before election
Joe Ortwerth
Republican
Elected County Executive
Joe Ortwerth
Republican

The 2002 St. Charles County Executive election took place on November 5, 2002. Incumbent Republican County Executive Joe Ortwerth ran for re-election. He was challenged by Democrat Joe Koester, a high school teacher, who was supported by several prominent local Republicans. Orthwerth won re-election with 55 percent of the vote, his lowest margin of victory since first winning in 1994.

== Democratic primary ==
=== Candidates ===
- Joe Koester, high school teacher

=== Results ===
Democratic primary results
Party	Candidate	Votes	%
Democratic	Joe Koester	8,582	100.00%
Total votes		8,582	100.00%

== Republican primary ==
=== Candidates ===
- Joe Ortwerth, incumbent County Executive

=== Results ===
Republican primary results
Party	Candidate	Votes	%
Republican	Joe Ortwerth (inc.)	23,096	100.00%
Total votes		23,096	100.00%

== General election ==
=== Results ===
2002 St. Charles County Executive election
Party	Candidate	Votes	%
Republican	Joe Ortwerth (inc.)	55,880	55.12%
Democratic	Joe Koester	45,491	44.88%
Total votes		101,371	100.00%
Republican hold			
